is a 1960 Japanese science fiction film directed by Ishirō Honda, with special effects by Eiji Tsuburaya. The film is the story of a librarian (Yoshio Tsuchiya), his love for a dancer and his ability to change into a gaseous form.

Plot 
While investigating a mysterious bank robber, Detective Okamoto encounters dancer Fujichiyo Kasuga and her servant, Jiya. Okamoto's girlfriend, newspaper reporter Kyoko Kono, insists on helping him despite him not taking her seriously. Shortly thereafter, another bank is robbed, with the culprit mysteriously evading all security measures, surviving gunfire from a police officer, and killing the officer and an employee before vanishing.

Kyoko informs Okamoto that Fujichiyo is from a wealthy and respected family, but has not performed in some time. He also learns from his superior Tabata that the bank victims died from asphyxiation. Okamoto and Kyoko discover that Fujichiyo is planning to perform again, but is reticent about the details. They follow her to a library, where the librarian Mizuno tells them that she has been studying ancient songs and engravings. Fujichiyo also approaches a respected chamber music tutor named Osaki and offers him 200,000 yen to perform. Okamoto reports these findings and his suspicion of her possible sponsor to Tabata, who recommends continuing to investigate Fujichiyo's dealings.

A suspect is arrested after making a call to Kyoko's newspaper announcing the date and time of the next robbery, but Okamoto and Kyoko feel that his story does not add up. Their suspicions of Fujichiyo appear confirmed when she attempts to pay for a theater space with stolen money. She is arrested and questioned, but refuses to say where the money came from.

Sometime later, Mizuno surrenders himself to the police and offers to show them how he committed the robberies. He is brought to the second bank he robbed, where he demonstrates his ability to turn himself into a gaseous form that allows him to evade gunfire, pass through vault bars, and asphyxiate another cop. Before he escapes through an overhead window, he demands Fujichiyo's release. However, she still refuses to cooperate and is kept in police custody. Mizuno attempts a rescue, but she refuses to leave and be seen as a criminal herself. Mizuno instead releases the other prisoners, causing a clash with police.

Kyoko convinces her newspaper to print an invitation to Mizuno, who arrives at the designated time and place. He explains that a scientist named Dr. Sano experimented on him and caused his transformation. Mizuno then killed Dr. Sano in a rage, but is now grateful for his powers and the chance to help his love Fujichiyo dance again. The police arrive and attempt to subdue Mizuno, but he escapes once again.

The police are soon forced to release Fujichiyo as she cannot be charged. She proceeds with her performance plans despite the musicians' refusal to attend out of fear. Mizuno visits her and declares his love, saying he would do anything for her. Scientist Dr. Tamiya meets with Okamoto and Tabata to devise a plan to destroy Mizuno using explosive gas. Kyoko pleads with Fujichiyo to cancel the performance, but she refuses, feeling it is her destiny and expressing love for Mizuno.

On the night of the recital, as media and emergency crews observe the theater, a number of onlookers enter demanding to see the "Human Vapor". Mizuno stands before them, announces that he is the Human Vapor, and transforms, scaring the crowd away. Fujichiyo and Jiya insist on continuing, and despite Kyoko's pleas, the switch is thrown to detonate the theater, but the circuit board has been sabotaged and the plan appears to be a failure. As the performance ends and Mizuno embraces Fujichiyo, she covertly pulls out a cigarette lighter and strikes it, destroying herself, Jiya (who chose to stay with her to the end), the theater, and Mizuno, who returns to solid form in death.

Cast 
 Yoshio Tsuchiya as Mizuno, Librarian/Human Vapor
 Tatsuya Mihashi as Detective Okamoto 
 Kaoru Yachigusa as Fujichiyo Kasuga
 Keiko Sata as Kyoko Kono, Reporter
 Hisaya Ito as Dr. Tamiya 
 Yoshifumi Tajima as Sergent Tabata 
 Yoshio Kosugi as Detective Inao 
 Fuyuki Murakami as Dr. Sano
 Bokuzen Hidari as Jiya, Fujichiyo's Attendant
 Takamaru Sasaki as Police Chief
 Minosuke Yamada as Hayama, Official
 Tatsuo Matsumura as Ikeda, Editor 
 Ko Mishima as Fujita, Detective 
 Kozo Nomura as Kawasaki, Kyoko's Fellow Reporter 
 Ren Yamamoto as Nomura, Robber 
 Somesho Matsumoto as Fujichiyo's Teacher 
 Tetsu Nakamura as Tobe, Journalist 
 Toki Shiozawa as Satoyo, Wife 
 Kamayuki Tsubonoas Ozaki, Policeman 
 Yasuhisa Tsutsumi as Bank Manager 
 Akio Kusama, Yutaka Oka as Cops 
 Yukihiko Gondo as Hotta, Guard 
 Shoichi Hirose as Guard 
 Wataru Omae, Hideo Shibuya as Audience Members 
 Junpei Natsuki as Bystander 
 Haruo Nakajima as Bank patron with black glasses (uncredited)

Production

Writing
The third in Toho’s “Transforming Human” series, The Human Vapor, was almost directed by Jun Fukuda before Ishiro Honda became available. Early versions of the script are similar to the finished film except for one scene Honda insisted be cut, Mizuno was to have murdered the wife and child of a policeman. Storyboards also show a much more dramatic version of the scene where Mizuno escapes the police from a high rise building. In the storyboards, Mizuno dramatically jumps through the glass. We cut to an exterior shot of Mizuno’s clothes flapping in the air as he dissolves while the police are shooting at him.

The script, by Takeshi Kimura, had been languishing at Toho since 1958 before production began. In addition, original drafts of the film were simply titled "Toho's Third Mutant Movie". However, by the time it was released, it had been beaten to the market by other films in the genre such as The Secret of the Telegian (1960) earlier that year. For reference, the earlier two "mutant" films being referenced were The Invisible Avenger (1954) and H-Man (1958).

Filming
Producer Tomoyuki Tanaka asked actor Tadao Nakamura, who was Sudo the telegraphed man in The Secret of the Telegian (1960) to play the Mizuno the vapor man for this film but declined.

Kunio Miyaguchi’s music for this film would later be reused in the Tsuburaya Productions TV shows Ultra Q (1966) and Ultraman (1966-67).

Special effects
A rubber balloon mannequin of Tsuchiya was made and was used to simulate the Gas Man’s transformation. Air was inflated into the balloon and deflated while filmed at high speed. Small grains of dry ice were used inside the balloon with lukewarm water at the bottom of the it.

English version 
The Human Vapor was released theatrically in the United States in 1964 by Brenco Pictures Corporation. It was later re-released on a double feature with Gorath in 1969. The American version re-structured the film from a mystery story to a narrative focused around Mizuno told from his point of view. Approximately 11 minutes of footage was cut, while a portion of Kunio Miyauchi's score was replaced with stock music, primarily from Paul Sawtell's score for The Fly. Eventually, the rights to the film in the U.S. were acquired by Metro-Goldwyn-Mayer, who released it on VHS throughout the 1980s and 1990s. The film is currently unavailable on DVD or Blu-ray in the United States, though it occasionally airs on Comet TV.

Release
The film was distributed in Japan by Toho on December 11, 1960. It was later released in the United States as The Human Vapor by Brenco Pictures with an English-language dub May 20, 1964. The film was released as a  double feature with Gorath, and was edited down to 79 minutes.

Reception
In a contemporary review, "Whit." of Variety declared the film plot superior to its companion double feature Gorath and that its special effects by Eiji Tsuburaya were "expert", while the acting was "competent". The review concluded that the English-language dub they watched was "far from gratifying" and that when the lips did not match the English dialogue it "decreased realism".

See also 

 4D Man

References

Footnotes

Sources

External links 

 Scheib, Richard. THE HUMAN VAPOR (Gas Ningen Daiichigo)
 

1960 films
1960s science fiction films
Films about bank robbery
Films directed by Ishirō Honda
Films produced by Tomoyuki Tanaka
Films set in Tokyo
Japanese serial killer films
Toho tokusatsu films
1960s Japanese films